Reality  is the 39th studio album by American musician James Brown. The album was released in 1974, by Polydor Records.

Release
Reality was released in late 1974. It charted on the Billboard 200 for 10 weeks, peaking at number 56.

Reception

In a contemporary review, the NME reviewed both Reality and Breakin' Bread, stating that the album were "pretty much up to the standard of his last few [records]." which he found was both positive and negative noting that there has been no major progression in his music since 1972. The review concluded that both albums were "very well produced, exceedingly exciting and irresistible for dancing, but who needs James Brown & The J.B.'s when you can have The Fatback Band or B.T. Express?"

AllMusic gave the album a negative review, noting that Brown's "insane schedule was catching up to him" and that it found him "at an artistic impasse." The reviewer noted that "it was foolish to expect a "fun" album from Brown during this time. He seemed to view America as a doomed nation, and considered the gas shortage, Watergate, and unemployment lines as signs of the coming apocalypse. A hint of sadness and ennui cloaks over the album." The review critiqued "The Twist" as Brown hitting a writer's block and that the cover of "Don't Fence Me In" was another sign of his "desperation". The review noted that the album contained "his worst ballads on record".

Track listing
Track listing adapted from vinyl of Reality.

Personnel
Credits adapted from back cover of Reality.
James Brown – producer, arrangements
Fred Wesley – arrangements, production supervisor
Dave Matthews – arrangements on "The Twist"
Bob Both – engineer, production supervisor
David Stone – assistant engineer
Major Little – assistant engineer
Don Brautigam – illustration

References

1974 albums
James Brown albums
Albums arranged by David Matthews (keyboardist)
Albums produced by James Brown
Polydor Records albums